A slip coach, slip carriage or slip portion in Britain and Ireland, also known as a flying switch in North America, is one or more carriages designed to be uncoupled from the rear of a moving train. The detached portion continued under its own momentum following the main train until slowed by its own guard using the brakes, bringing the slip to a stop, usually at the next station. The coach or coaches were thus said to be slipped from the train without it having to stop. This allowed the train to serve intermediate stations, without unduly delaying the main train. The reverse process defied the ingenuity of inventors.

Slip coaches as described above were mainly used in Britain and Ireland from 1858 until 1960, for most of this period there was serious competition between railway companies who strove to keep journey times as short as possible, avoiding intermediate stops wherever possible.

Competition increased as locomotives became bigger and able to haul heavier trains at faster speeds for longer distances, trains no longer need to stop so often, for fuel and water for themselves, using water troughs or track pans to fill up on the move, or for facility stops for passengers by providing corridor coaches, dining and sleeping carriages. Faster services were becoming progressively safer as more efficient continuous braking was fitted and the absolute block system installed on main lines. All these led to the use of slip services in some places where there was a financial advantage to the company to provide it.

Disadvantages
There were disadvantages to slip coaches. The slip portion was mostly isolated from the main train and its facilities such as a restaurant car, this didn't matter in the early days as it wasn't possible to move through a train from carriage to carriage, gangway connections starting to be used from 1882 and throughout a train by 1892, most slip connections were not fitted with gangways even if the rest of the train was. The LNWR seems to have been the only exception using slips with gangways for a few months before WWI.

The slip service needed additional staff, at least an extra guard for the slip portion and possibly the use of a locomotive and its crew (or sometimes a horse) if the slip wasn't able to reach the platform, often the slip portion would be attached to another train or locomotive for an onward journey. Whilst these additional staff requirements were lower than if an additional train had been provided they were still substantial. If the weather was bad, usually because of snow or fog, it may not have been possible for the slip to be safely effected, in which case the train usually halted to detach the coach.

Slip carriages were also confusing to some passengers, there are frequent reports of passengers getting into the wrong carriage of a train and ending up somewhere they didn't want to be. This could occasionally lead to passengers causing trains to stop by using the emergency communication system.

A few examples of slips being used in other countries will be found below. In some countries, such as India, slip coach refers to a coach that terminates its journey at a station prior to the final destination of the rest of the train. The coach or coaches are left behind after being detached from the train while it is stationary.

Slipped coaches were often also through coaches in that they often continued to another destination either by having a separate locomotive attached or by being attached to another train.

History
There was limited space at the terminals, they consequently used a system known as fly-shunting. The system allowed the company to operate three trains with a single locomotive. There were two platforms at each end of the short,  line, as a locomotive and its train approached the points before a terminus the driver would signal the guard who would detach the carriages from the locomotive and apply his brakes to slow down while the locomotive ran through the points to another waiting train, the points would be changed after the locomotive had passed and the carriages run into the platform under their own momentum and brakes. The locomotive and its new train then proceeded to the other terminus where the process would be repeated.

Samuel Wilfred Haugton, the locomotive superintendent of the Dublin and Kingstown Railway following a visit to the L&GR in September 1849 took the technique back to Ireland, where following alterations to locomotives and installation of semi-automatic points, it remained in use for several years.

Another early example of slip services was on the Hayle Railway which started passenger operations in 1843. The company operated three daily mixed mineral and passenger trains with the passenger coaches at the rear of the train, and the practice approaching Hayle was to uncouple the passenger portion while the train was in motion, let the mineral train negotiate a set of points which were then switched allowing the passenger coaches to coast (sometimes with the assistance of a waiting horse) to the passenger station. These trains were still running in 1850 despite there having been a non-fatal accident in 1843.

The portions were connected with a patent coupling and the instructions to the staff made sure the side chains were not connected. The complete train was to slow as it approached Haywards Heath, the slip effected and the slipped portion to slow itself to arrive gently at the station platform. Once the slipped portion had stopped at the platform the engine to haul it to Hastings was allowed to exit the siding where it had been waiting and attach itself to the front of the new train. The slipping was coordinated by a series of communication bell signals between the guards on the two portions of the train and the locomotive crew.

The slip service being introduced in December 1858 with a slip at Banbury off the 9:30 a.m. from Paddington.

The South Eastern Railway (SER) was an early user of slip services, there is a possibility that they started a month before the LB&SCR, in January 1858.

The remaining British railway companies adopted slipping with varying degrees of enthusiasm, with 58 daily slips being made by 9 companies in 1875, rising to 189 being made by 12 companies in 1914 when slipping was at its peak. During World War I, slip services almost disappeared, as there were fewer staff available to operate any service and slip services needed an additional guard compared to the train stopping. After the war, slip services did not attract any priority, services were necessarily slower than normal because the railway suffered from a maintenance backlog, there was still a shortage of staff and companies were uncertain what the future held after the railways had been under Government control during the war. In 1918, there were 8 daily slip services, rising to 31 at the Grouping and reaching a post-war peak of 47 in 1924.

They gradually fell out of favour for many reasons, in the South East the railways were electrified allowing faster acceleration, elsewhere trains were travelling faster and able to reach their destinations without slipping coaches but instead stopping, where they could also pick up passengers, without a later arrival time. Perhaps the most compelling reason, according to the Manchester Guardian, was the lack of corridor connections to the rest of the train, slip coach passengers couldn't access the restaurant car.

Early rope working slip
It operated as two independent side-by-side railways, each worked by stationary engines and a rope which was wound on and off large drums at each end of the line. 
The carriages would start off at four stations and the process was as follows:
 Five carriages connected together would leave Fenchurch Street and coast using gravity to Minories where they would be stopped.
 When all eight carriages were attached, and the confirmation telegraphed, to the destination terminus the rope would be started.
 As the rear-most carriage approached its destination the guard would release it, bringing the carriage to rest using his brakes. This happened at Stepney,  and  leaving the remaining four carriages to be released shortly before Blackwall into which they coasted under their own impetus.
 The rope then stopped.
 The opposite then happened, four coaches were free-wheeled out of Blackwall, all eight coaches, at the various stations were attached to the rope, telegraph signal told the engine operator all was attached and the rope wound in the opposite direction, slipping coaches at Stepney, Shadwell and Minories, where one stopped and five coasted into Fenchurch Street.

This process was then repeated, the whole process taking 30 minutes, a fifteen-minute service was achieved by the other line operating in the opposite direction. The system worked quite well so long as the cables didn't break. The line was converted to locomotive haulage in 1848.

Slip operation

Carriage design
Design principles for slip coaches would have been the same as for most other coaches with a few modifications:
they may need to cater for all classes of traveller, although this would not be as necessary if the slip coach was to be used in conjunction with others, to make up a slip portion.
they will need a guard's compartment equipped with slip and braking controls at at least one end, coaches with a suitable compartment at both ends could be used in either direction without the use of a turntable.
the slip guard would need to see forwards once the slip has been effected so the end must have windows, in some cases the guard needed outside access to effect the slip in which case the window needs to open.
toilet facilities may be required for longer trips.
Not all slip carriages were originally designed as such, often a carriage would be converted, at least in the early stages of a company's operations.

Block working and lights
Block working was the normal way of train signalling which ensured an interval of space was maintained between trains, the normal rule was that only one train was allowed in a block at a time, once a train slipped a coach there were two trains in a block and regulations had to be created to overcome this problem and still work safely.

Trains were fitted with a red tail-lamp so that signalling staff could tell the train was complete when it past a signal box, no tail-lamp indicating that the train had divided somehow and part of the train was still in the previous section of track. Special arrangements had to be made for slip portions to show this was deliberate, in 1897 the Railway Clearing House published guidelines to standardise these arrangements. If there was only one slip portion it had to carry a red and a white light set between two red tail lamps, one above the other, if there were two slips to be made the first to be detached was marked as described and the last slip had to carry a red light beside a white light, and in one case, the Cornish Riviera Express took three slip portions, the middle slip had a triangle of three red lights.

Slipping mechanism
There were two main types of slipping mechanism:
In the first type, the outer shackle of a three link screw coupling was hinged, it was held closed by spring latch. The slip guard operated it by a rope release which released the spring which in turn allowed the screw coupling to open and release from the main train.
The second type uses a modified hook on the front of the slip coach. The front part of the hook is hinged so that it opens forwards and releases the main train screw coupling. The hook is held closed by a bolt operated by a lever in the guards compartment.

A method was also required to disconnect any continuous brake system running through the train, this was usually managed by the slip guard turning a stop or slip cock, this closed the pipe off from the main train. In later years trains were often steam heated with pipes running from the locomotive through the length of the train, these pipes had to be closed off prior to slipping, this was often done at the station before the slip until pipe connectors were invented that sealed automatically when the pipe separated.

On-train preparation
The slipping mechanism would usually only be used to connect the slip coach to the main train from the station previous to where the slip was to take place, prior to that the normal three link coupling would be used, this ensured the slip portion was not unduly put under strain, nor could it be inadvertently operated.

British and Irish company operations
The following lists are snap-shots of slip services operated by the various railways, not all of the slips operated all of the time, there was no universal trend, each company judged when they thought it was financially advantageous to operate slip services.

Bristol and Exeter Railway (B&ER) later GWR

Great Western Railway (GWR) later BR(W)

One unusual slip service occurred in 1866–1867 at Paddington itself, the 8.15 a.m. service from Windsor & Eton Central to Farringdon Street in the City of London via the Metropolitan Railway slipped a portion for Paddington mainline station while it went to Paddington (Bishop's Road) where it made an end-on connection to the Metropolitan Railway. The slip appears to have run on its own momentum into Paddington terminus where it was due three minutes after its host train arrived at Bishop's Road.

By 1885, the GWR had 15 broad-gauge and 32 standard-gauge slip coaches in daily use. Reading got the most slips with up to thirteen daily, nearly all off up trains, once detached the slip would be diverted across the down line into the platform. Some of the coaches made extended journeys being slipped several times before being returned to their start point.

GWR slip services continued to grow with forty-nine daily in 1900, peaking at seventy-nine in 1908 then steadying at around seventy until 1914.

A third slip was added in 1907 at Taunton which terminated there. The slips ceased during WWI and restarted shortly after the war ended with slips at Taunton and Exeter, the Westbury slip returning the following year. This pattern continued until 1935 when Westbury station could be avoided, a slip still took place but earlier on the line and the slip was worked by a locomotive coming out from the station for it. At the same time the Taunton and Exeter slips were stopped, being replaced by another train. This pattern of a single slip at Westbury continued until the outbreak of WWII.

During WWI slipping tailed off on the GWR, down to thirty-four in 1916 and none in 1918 before a slow post-war revival. The GWR made thirty-one daily slips in 1922 rising to forty-seven in 1924 and then slowly declining with forty in 1928 and twenty in 1938. Slipping ceased completely during WWII and then just a few returned with five daily slips in 1946.

London, Brighton and South Coast Railway (LB&SCR) later SR
After their early start in 1858 the LB&SCR slowly adopted slip coach practices with three services in 1875 rising to nine in 1900, by which time they had used them at seven different places.

The number of slips continued to increase with fifteen in 1910 (sixteen on Saturdays), twenty-three in 1912 and twenty-seven by 1914 by which time slips took place in ten different places in both up and down directions, at times there were twenty-one coaches slipped each day on the Brighton main line alone.

The use of slips slowed during WWI, with fourteen in 1916 and just three in 1918. Despite the uncertainties they rose back to eighteen in 1922, but after the Southern Railway was formed their policy combined with a gradual electrification of the main lines reduced the need for slips and they had all stopped by April 1932.

Lancashire and Yorkshire Railway (L&YR) later LMS
The L&YR introduced its first slip service in the 1880s. By 1901, there were six Rochdale slips, seven in 1904, five in 1908 and just two in 1910 and 1914, the number of slips reducing because more of the trains made a stop at Rochdale.

One slip in particular has been called famous or the trickiest, the Accrington slip.

The L&YR continued to use some slips during WWI and they continued into the London, Midland and Scottish Railway (LMS) era until they were withdrawn  during the LMS economy drive.

London and North Western Railway (LNWR)
These early slips had all ceased to operate by 1895, in 1896 a new slip service was run for a short period at  followed in 1897 by a new service at  after which there was a build up of services with eighteen daily in 1910 and nineteen in 1914.

Pre WWI slips happened at:
, two of which went on to  via , 
 for Bletchley and  via the Banbury–Verney Junction branch line,
 for Coventry, this last slip had by 1914 been provided with a vestibuled gangway connecting it to the main train which allowed passengers to partake of the restaurant car.

The LNWR slips gradually stopped during WWI and were not re-introduced.

Shrewsbury and Hereford Railway (S&HR)
The slips were probably taken on to Craven Arms Junction which connected with the Bishops Castle Railway, the Wellington to Craven Arms Railway and the Central Wales line.

Manchester, Sheffield and Lincolnshire Railway (MS&LR) later GCR

At some time, the slips continued through to serve Grimsby Town and Cleethorpes again.

From 1907 until 1914, and then re-instated after the war, the 6:20 p.m. This service was competitive with the GWR service.

Post WWI saw the re-introduction of the Woodford slip going on to Stratford-upon-Avon from around 1920. It is not clear if the two slips coincided or if the Woodford slip was re-introduced following the failure of the Brackley one. By November 1922 there were definitely two slips being made from 6:20 p.m. This service catered for a cluster of residences of prominent people who lived close to the station and had "formed a sort of travelling club", including a director of the GCR and later the LNER. These two slips, both attached to the 6:20 p.m. from Marylebone continued for thirteen years until the Woodford and Hinton railway accident.

Midland Railway (MR)

By 1900, slips had dwindled to 5 daily but then increased again to sixteen in 1903, fifteen in 1910 and nineteen in 1914. It was attached at Kettering, slipped at Wellingborough, then attached to another train and slipped again at Luton. Slipping stopped during WWI and was not resumed afterwards.

Great Northern Railway (GNR)
The GNR started its slip operations in 1864 and then built the number up steadily until the end of the 1880s, peaking at thirty in 1883, in 1885 it slipped the most of any company.

This service was running in 1887, but had stopped operations by 1895.

Great Eastern Railway (GER) later LNER
The GER started to slip coaches in 1872 and built up slowly with two slips in 1875, nine in 1880, seventeen in 1885, rising to a peak of twenty-five in 1904 then dropping to eighteen in 1914 and stopping altogether in WWI.

Slips were re-introduced after the war in much smaller numbers with two daily in 1921, it stayed at two although not always in the same places until 1937 when it went down to one, the final slip at  stopping in 1939.

North Eastern Railway (NER)
The NER didn't have much enthusiasm for slipping, at the most they had three per day, usually only one.

The NER stopped using slip coaches in 1905 and never started again.

North British Railway (NBR)
The NBR used slip coaches between 1870 and 1894, at most they had three slips in a day and from a maximum of five locations.

Glasgow and South Western Railway (G&SWR)
The slip section was attached to an Ardrossan to Ayr stopping train, with which it followed the main train. Six-wheel brake vans with end windows were built for the service.

London and South Western Railway (LSWR)

South Eastern Railway (SER) later SE&CR

London, Chatham and Dover Railway (LCDR) later SE&CR
The LCDR started slips in 1872, usually with three or four daily, peaking at five in 1896.

South Eastern and Chatham Railway (SE&CR)
Slipping ceased during WWI.

Furness Railway (FR)
The FR started to use slips in 1887, this was unusual for a line with such a rural nature running trains of moderate speeds. From 1888 a slip was made during the summers at  that connected with an Isle of Man steamer service. The Grange-over-Sands slips gradually reduced until there was only one, this finally ceased in 1916.

Caledonian Railway (CR)
By 1908 they were slipping twelve times daily which continued until 1914, slips were being made at;
 for Grangemouth, 
 and 
Lockerbie.

Great North of Scotland Railway (GNSR)

Belfast and Northern Counties Railway (BNCR) later NCC
In 1910, the Northern Counties Committee (NCC) was still operating the slip from the 8:00 a.m.

Great Northern Railway (Ireland) (GNRI)
In 1896, it began to slip a portion in the evening off a Belfast train at  only nine miles north of Dublin to cater to commuters. The following year saw  and  also getting slip portions for their commuters. These slips continued until 1910.

It was the second last slip coach to be discontinued in Ireland.

Great Southern and Western Railway (GS&WR) later GSR
The Limerick portions only lasted for a year and were replaced by a service that slipped at Kildare and  before taking the line to Limerick through .

The GS&WR began introducing slip coaches in November 1900. By 1902, the working of slips was regularly about six each day on down trains. The service peaked in 1913 with slips at:
 for Tullow,
 for Athlone,
 for Limeric, 

Most of the slips stopped during WWI with just two at Ballybrophy continuing. After the war some slips were re-introduced including one at Sallins and one at Kildare.

Belfast and County Down Railway (BCDR)
In 1902, the Donaghadee Golf Club asked for a "Golfer's Express" service. The response was to convert a brake third into a slip coach to be detached at Comber. The more usual Irish and British practice was for the slip _ coach guard to effect the uncoupling. But here it was done by the guard of the main train, who was helped by marker posts. First he disconnected the vacuum hoses, making sure that this did not cause a loss of pressure in the main train. Then he satisfied himself that the train was going fast enough to get away from the slipped portion. If visibility was poor or other conditions were not right for the slip, it did not go ahead. The Comber Station Master had authority to stop the train and have it uncouple in the ordinary Way.

As soon as the slip coach guard knew that he had been detached, he used his hand brake to make sure that he did not catch up with the main train, which had itself to slow for the curve south of the station. Then he used his vacuum brake to stop in the platform. Up to five ordinary coaches could be attached to the slip coach. Journey time from Belfast was 39 minutes. The slip coach ended in April 1918, as a “temporary” wartime measure. It never resumed but was replaced by a semi fast train at 12:12 p.m. each Saturday taking 44 minutes to Donaghadee with six stops.

Midland Great Western Railway (MGWR)
The slip was year round with an additional slip on the 8:45 a.m. during the summer. Both slips stopped during WWI, after the war a slip was reinstated on this route, attached to the 2:30 p.m. from Dublin being slipped at 3:15 p.m. The MGWR also had a slip at  serving  for a short while during the summer of 1918.

Great Southern Railways (GSR)

Slip coach incidents
The process of slipping increases the risk of collision if suitable precautions are not taken. The locomotive crew must be sure they have a clear route through the slipping station, the slip guard must also know the route is clear before attempting to slip because if the main train needs to stop after the slip has been effected there is a danger of the slip running into the back of it, this sometimes required the provision of additional signals.

Conversely, there needed to be a procedure for when the slip guard was unable to effect the slip, this usually involved the train having to stop to detach the coach in the station. Similar situations could occur when the weather was foggy or snowing.

Slipping procedures usually insisted that the slip guard was to only use the hand brake to control the braking of the slip, the continuous brakes were to only be used in an emergency.

Tunbridge 1866 
On 30 September 1866, four carriages which had been slipped from a Dover bound train ran through the station and collided with the back of a freight train. Eleven people were injured. The officer conducting the inquiry concluded that the accident appears to have been the result of a hazardous system of working, and the inexperience of the guard of the detached portion of the train.

Market Harborough 1879 
A railway worker walking along the track close to  stepped out of the way while an express went by but then stepped back into the way of a recently released slip which killed him.

Slough 1880 
The cause was apparently that one of the slip coach tail lamps had gone out, the signalman only seeing one light assumed the train had had an unscheduled split and part of it had been left behind.

Halesowen 1883 
On 12 August 1883, there were alterations being made to  station and a train with a slip coach was manually signalled to the platform, where the slip was performed, shortly after the platelayers foreman signalled the train and it stopped with the slip coach colliding into the back of it.

Werrington 1887 
On 14 March 1887, the single slip carriage which was to slip at Essendine became detached from the main train and then ran into the back of it when the train suddenly stopped probably caused by obsolescent coupling and brake equipment. Ten people were injured.

Reading 1894 
On 15 May 1894, a single coach had been slipped off the back of an express train out of Paddington, it ran into the station and collided with a static passenger train in the platform. Five passengers complained of shock or bruises. The officer conducting the inquiry concluded that three staff: the slip guard, the signalman and the platform inspector all contributed to the accident by not fully obeying the rules laid down for slip coach operation in the station.

Warwick 1895 

Marks Tey 1906 
On 29 December 1906, Four carriages which had been slipped from an Ipswich bound train ran into the back of the main portion of the train it had been slipped from. Thirty-four were injured. The officer conducting the inquiry concluded that it was a combination of mainly slip guard error but the driver was also in error and foggy weather played a part.

Polegate 1908 

Southall and Hanwell 1933 

Woodford and Hinton 1935 
On 19 December 1935, a through carriage to Stratford-on-Avon, attached at the rear of the 6:20 p.m. express from Marylebone to Bradford, was slipped at Woodford and Hinton. Shortly after this carriage had been detached, the main portion of the train stopped  unexpectedly, and the slip carriage ran into the back of it. Eleven passengers and two guards were injured. The officer conducting the inquiry concluded that it was primarily a mechanical failure of the brake pipe separation that was at fault.

Other countries

United States
In the United States a similar operation to slipping coaches is the flying switch:

Whilst it would appear that flying switches were mainly used with freight trains it was not exclusively so. Flying switches were used extensively when Grand Central Depot opened  in New York in 1871. The train shed was kept fairly quiet and smoke-free partly by the use of the “flying switch” 

The Boston and Maine Railroad used flying switches at White River Junction from mixed, freight and passenger, trains and had a fatal accident involving one on 8 March 1889.

The Old Colony Railroad used flying switches at junction stations, where slip coaches would be attached to a locomotive to continue on the branch line. The state regulatory body did not approve the practice, but did not have the authority to ban it outright. The Old Colony stopped using flying switches after an 1883 incident on the Milton Branch, three coaches were slipped at Neponset and collided with the waiting locomotive, whose crew had jumped clear just prior to the collision, which then ran crewless for three and a half miles before being switched onto a siding where it collided with freight cars.

France

Two further French slips of more recent date belong to the same system - now the French National Railway Company, but when Acworth wrote, the Western railway of France.

The Netherlands
An early use of a slip carriage in the Netherlands made its appearance on the Dutch Rhenish Railway in October 1886. A non-stop express from Amsterdam to Rotterdam via Gouda slipped a carriage at Woerden for The Hague.

The Netherlands Railway Museum has, among a collection of destination plates affixed to the sides of carriages, one marked Sliprijtuig voor Hilversum - 'slip carriage for Hilversum' - coming from the Holland Iron Railway about 1900.

Slip carriages were also used at Bussum between 1895 and 1904.

In Preservation

In fiction
In the 18th series of Thomas & Friends, three slip coaches from the Great Western Railway are introduced, and belong to Duck.

A short story The Slip Carriage written by Walter Thornbury was published in The Albion, an International Journal in 1873.

A short story The Slip Coach written by Emily Elizabeth Steele Elliott was published in 1873 in her book Stories for workers, by the author of 'Copsley annals'''.The Slip Coach Mystery: A Railway Adventure written by V.L. Whitechurch was published in the first issue of The Railway Magazine in 1897.A Narrow Escape was published in Pearson's Magazine, 1897 where a wanted man disappeared from a train utilising a slip coach.

Cy Warman published a short story Jack Farley's Flying Switch in 1900 in his collection Short Rails.

Cuthbert Edward Baines had The Slip Coach published in 1927, described in a Times advert as "A thrilling romance of crime".

Lynn Brock wrote The Slip-Carriage Mystery the fourth novel in his Colonel Gore detective series, published in 1928.

Herman McNeile, writing under his pen-name "Sapper", published Mystery of the Slip-Coach in his book Ronald Standish published in 1933, the story was also published in the anthology Blood on the Tracks in 2018.

The following are examples of the term slip being used for a through coach as the train in question, the Orient Express, had through coaches to several destinations, they were all uncoupled while the train was stopped.

 In Chapter 15 of The Mask of Dimitrios by Eric Ambler, the protagonist mentions having booked a seat on the Athens slip coach of the Orient Express.
 Agatha Christie mentions a slip coach from Athens in her story Murder in the Calais Coach, the title of the United States version of Murder on the Orient Express.
 Graham Greene's Stamboul Train - An Entertainment mentions the slip coach for Athens''.

See also

Dividing train
Through coach

Notes

References

Sources

External links

A page describing the practice of slipping coaches
Video footage of the final slip coach operation on YouTube

Railway coaches of the United Kingdom
Passenger railroad cars